The 1982–83 Stanford Cardinal men's basketball team represented Stanford University. The Cardinal, led by first year head coach Tom Davis, played their home games at Maples Pavilion

Roster

Schedule
 
|-
!colspan=9 style=| Regular Season

References

Stanford Cardinal men's basketball seasons
Stanford
Stanford Card
Stanford Card